Independence of Bangladesh was declared on 26 March 1971, celebrated as Independence Day, from Pakistan. The Independence Day of Bangladesh is celebrated on 26 March when Sheikh Mujibur Rahman declared the Independence of Bangladesh. The Bangladesh Liberation War started on 26 March and lasted till 16 December 1971 which is celebrated as Victory Day in Bangladesh. There is a dispute along partisan line on who declared the Independence of Bangladesh. The Awami League claim Sheikh Mujibur Rahman while the Bangladesh Nationalist Party claim it was Ziaur Rahman.

History
In 1905, the British Raj partitioned Bengal into East Bengal and West Bengal. The British introduced the Morley-Minto Reforms in 1909 which made the electorate system based on religion and East Bengal was largely Muslim. The Bengal Provincial Muslim League was created to represent Bengali Muslims. The two Bengals were joined back together in 1912 in a decision by the British which was unpopular among the Muslims which feared it would harm the interests of their community. The 1946 Cabinet Mission to India decided to partition Bengal and in 1947 Bengal war partitioned again. West Bengal went to India and East Bengal went to Pakistan becoming East Pakistan. The Partition of India took place along religious lines with Muslim majority areas going to Pakistan.

East Pakistan, where Bengali was the language spoken by the majority, opposed the move by the founder of Pakistan, Mohammed Ali Jinnah, to make Urdu the national language. The people of East Pakistan demanded Bengali be made a national language in the Bengali Language movement. Krishak Sramik Party demanded autonomy for East Bengal in 1953 and won the provincial election against the Pakistan Muslim League in 1954. A. K. Fazlul Huq, leader of the Krishak Sramik Party, becomes the chief minister of East Pakistan. On 31 May 1954, the Krishak Sramik Party was removed from power. Chief Minister A. K. Fazlul Huq and party  general secretary Sheikh Mujibur Rahman were placed under house arrest on charges of separatism.

From 1963 to 1965, East Pakistan presented a case of economic deprivation with resources from the province benefitting West Pakistan at the cost of development in East Pakistan. Sheikh Mujibur Rahman, now leader of the Awami League, was arrested in 1966 and charged in the Agartala conspiracy case, which accused prominent East Pakistanis of trying to separate the country with help from India, in 1968. The 1969 East Pakistan mass uprising saw the charges in the Agartala conspiracy case being dropped. Sarbadalia Chhatra Sangram Parishad was created to press the government of Pakistan for the Independence of East Pakistan. Sheikh Mujibur Rahman is released from prison on 22 February 1970 by President Ayub Khan. On 10 March 1970, Sheikh Mujibur Rahman demanded autonomy for East Pakistan based on the Six Point program of the Awami League. Moulana Abdul Hamid Khan Bhashani ends a public event with the slogan East Pakistan Zindabad on 23 November. 1970 Bhola cyclone killed 300 to 500 thousand people in East Pakistan. The people of East Pakistan found relief efforts by Pakistan government inadequate and felt neglected.

Awami League, led by Sheikh Mujibur Rahman, won 288 seats out of 300 seats in the provincial assembly. It won 167 of 300 seats in the National Assembly of Pakistan. Despite the overwhelming victory, the Awami League was not allowed to form a government by the military administration of Pakistan led by General Yahya Khan. On 7 March 1971, Sheikh Mujibur Rahman gave a historic speech to resist the West Pakistan administration, through refusing to follow their orders and paying taxes. The crowd at the event chanted Jai Bangla (victory to Bengal). On 19 March, soldiers of Pakistan Army from East Pakistan and West Pakistan had a small skirmish at the Gazipur Ordnance Factory after the East Bengal Regiment refused to fire at crowds of protesting Bengalis. On 24 March, soldiers of East Pakistan Rifles raised the fliag of independent Bangladesh in Jessore District.

Proclamation by Sheikh Mujibur Rahman 
On 26 March 1971, Sheikh Mujibur Rahman declared independence on radio after, Pakistan launched a crackdown on East Pakistan called Operation Searchlight and declared martial law, which was heard by only a limited number of people due to the broadcasting system used. Sheikh Mujibur Rahman was detained by Pakistan Army soon after. On 27 March, Major Ziaur Rahman, officer of the East Bengal Regiment, declared the Independence of Bangladesh from Swadhin Bangla Betar Kendra on behalf of Sheikh Mujibur Rahman and called the actions of Pakistan Army a massacre while asking for intervention of the United Nations. On 10 May Bengals members of provincial and national assembly gathered in Kolkata and created a government in exile. It created the Proclamation of Independence which was read from Baidyanathtala in Meherpur District.

International recognition of Bangladesh

Bhutan recognized Bangladesh on 6 December and India a few hours later on the same day. They were the first two countries to recognize independent Bangladesh. East Germany recognized Bangladesh on 11 January 1972, third country to do so. On 7 February, Israel recognised Bangladesh following a request by the foreign minister of Bangladesh, Mastaque Ahmed.

Independence Day 
The Independence Day of Bangladesh is celebrated on 26 March on the day Sheikh Mujibur Rahman declared the Independence of Bangladesh. Various programs are organised in the country to mark the occasion. The National Flag of Bangladesh is flown on all government buildings. The Independence Day Award was introduced by the Government of Bangladesh in 1977. The award is given on the Independence Day of Bangladesh on 26 March. The first Independence Day was celebrated on 26 March 1972. President Sheikh Mujibur Rahman addressed the nation.

Bangladesh Liberation War
The launch of Operation Searchlight and declaration of Independence marked the start of Bangladesh Liberation War on 26 March 1971. The war lasted nine months and ended on 16 December 1971. The Pakistan Army targeted religious minorities and political supporters of the Independence of Bangladesh. The actions culminated in what is known as the Bangladesh Genocide. During the war, 15 million refugees from East Pakistan moved to India.

Victory day
Victory Day is on 16 December and it commemorates the surrender of Pakistan to Bangladesh India joint forces at the end of Bangladesh Liberation War. It is celebrated as Vijay Diwas in India.

Controversy
There is some dispute between the Awami League and the Bangladesh Nationalist party, founded by Ziaur Rahman, on who declared the Independence of Bangladesh. When a different party comes to power, they change the history books of Bangladesh to either prefer Sheikh Mujibur Rahman or Ziaur Rahman.

References 

Bangladesh Liberation War
Bangladesh
Political history of Bangladesh
1970s conflicts
East Pakistan
Military history of Bangladesh
1971 in Bangladesh
Wars involving Bangladesh
Wars involving Pakistan
Wars of independence
Bangladesh–Pakistan relations
1971 in international relations